Hadar is a replica of a small Northwich narrowboat of the Star Class originally built for the Grand Unicorn Canal Carrying Company (GUCCCo.) by W.J. Yarwoods of Northwich. She was built by Roger Fuller Boatbuilders Ltd of Stone, Staffordshire, and completed in 2007, and painted by Tina Paramore.

Owner-operators 
She is owned and operated by Keith and Jo Lodge. Keith first started working on canals in 1968 at the age of 15 on an ex-working narrowboat Pisces, now operated by the Hillingdon Narrowboats Association, which is still running today as a community trip boat, which it was when Keith started on it. Hadar is a close copy of Pisces. Jo was introduced to canals and narrowboats when she met Keith in 2000. For 10 years, from June 2007 until November 2017, the boat carried and sold coal, but now is just used for domestic purposes.

Dimensions 
The boat's colour scheme is that which the GUCCCo. adopted in 1937 in celebration of the coronation of King George VI and Queen Elizabeth.

Engine 

Hadar's engine is a National DA2 built in 1949 at Trojan Ltd of Croydon on behalf of the National Gas & Oil Engine Conpany as part of an order of 18 such engines to be made into generator sets by Auto Diesels of Uxbridge for dispatch to Middle East Pipelines.
These are the specifications for the engine:

Name 
The name Hadar comes from the GUCCCo. Star Class boats being named after stars or constellations. "Hadar" is more commonly known as "Beta Centauri" and is the tenth-brightest star in the night sky. It is in the southern hemisphere and part of the Centaurus constellation and one of the two stars that point to the Southern Cross.

Fleet number 
Hadar carries the fleet number 48. The GUCCCo. numbered their boats in alphabetical order, and Hadar would have been numbered between Grus No.47 and Henry No.49. No.48 was originally allocated to a boat called The Hawk, which was inherited from the original Associated Canal Carriers Limited, and was sold off in 1936, so the fleet No.48 has been vacant since then. Coincidentally Hadar is the 48th boat built by Roger Fuller.

Events 
Hadar can be seen on the UK canals throughout the whole year, and may be occasionally seen at canal festivals and rallies. During 2011 it attended the reopening ceremony for the Droitwich Canals, after taking 30 years to restore, having been officially abandoned in 1939. It also appeared in 2011 in a BBC Four programme The Golden Age of Canals, which showed the hard work and dedication of the early pioneers of canal restoration, which has resulted in many lost canals being restored, and many more still under restoration, and the creation of the Inland Waterways Association. It was also used as part of the C&RT North West Launch Event in Manchester in 2012 when British Waterways, a statutory corporation wholly owned by the government of the United Kingdom, the custodians of English canals since the canal system was nationalized in 1948, became a charitable trust and was renamed Canal & River Trust.

Home mooring 
As from October 2013 Hadar has a residential mooring at the Saltisford Arm of the Grand Union Canal in Warwick, in what was part of the original Warwick and Birmingham Canal to its terminus on the outskirts of Warwick, the arm being created when the Warwick and Napton Canal was joined to the Warwick and Birmingham Canal about a half mile north of the site of the original terminus, however the existing arm is now half its original length.

References

External links 
 Yarwoods 
 National Gas & Oil Engine Company
 Trojan Museum Trust
 Anson Engine Museum
 Droitwich Canals Droitwich Canals Trust
 Inland Waterways Association
 Associated Canal Carriers Limited
 Saltisford Canal Trust
 Hadar's BLOG
 Hadar's Business Website

Replica ships